The Santa Cruz Mountains AVA is an American Viticultural Area centered on the Santa Cruz Mountains. Its territory expands three California counties, Santa Clara, Santa Cruz and San Mateo. Established in 1981 by the Alcohol and Tobacco Tax and Trade Bureau (TTB), Santa Cruz Mountains AVA was among the first to be defined by its mountain topography.

The mountainous terrain, the Pacific Ocean, and the nearby San Francisco Bay have wide-ranging effects on the appellation, creating myriad microclimates in the region - depending on the elevation of the land, on which side of the mountains are the vineyards, the effects of fog, sun exposure, soil type, etc.

Geography
The region is bounded by the Santa Cruz Mountain range, from the northern boundary of Half Moon Bay and Woodside to its southern side of Mount Madonna and Watsonville. The appellation encompasses some  extending through Santa Cruz, Santa Clara and San Mateo counties.

Wine regions
Santa Cruz Mountains' subregions are Skyline, Saratoga/Los Gatos, Summit, the Coastal Foothills (above Santa Cruz), Ben Lomond Mountain, and Corralitos/Pleasant Valley.

Vineyards and grape varieties
There are over 200 small vineyards totaling only app.  of wine grape varieties, divided about ¼ evenly among Pinot noir, Cabernet Sauvignon, Chardonnay, and other varieties (most notably Merlot and Zinfandel).  The region's vineyards and wineries actively support sustainable practices, including cover crops, erosion control, canopy management, solar, biodiesel. Several vineyards grow organically; presently four are certified organic by the CCOF and more are in the process of certification.

Wines and wineries
Some of the oldest wineries in California are in this region. Two wineries from the Santa Cruz Mountain locale participated in the 1976 Judgment of Paris wine tasting with David Bruce Winery's 1973 Chardonnay placing 10th in the white category and the Ridge Vineyards' 1971 Monte Bello Cabernet Sauvignon placing 5th in the red wines. 

Other notable wineries in the appellation are Big Basin Vineyards, Sante Arcangeli, Silver Mountain Vineyards, Eden Estates, Alfaro Family Vineyards, Armitage Wines, Mount Eden vineyards, Hallcrest Vineyards, Byington Vineyard, Bargetto Winery, Thomas Fogarty Winery, Kathryn Kennedy Winery, Mountain Winery and Savannah-Chanelle Vineyards.

References

External links
A History of the Wineries of the Los Gatos-Santa Cruz Mountains
A website about the wineries of the Santa Cruz Mountains

Wineries in Santa Cruz Mountains
American Viticultural Areas of California
American Viticultural Areas of the San Francisco Bay Area
Geography of Santa Cruz County, California
Geography of San Mateo County, California
Geography of Santa Clara County, California
Santa Cruz Mountains
1981 establishments in California
American Viticultural Areas